The second season of Eesti otsib superstaari started on February 3, 2008 and lasted until June 2008. The hosts of first season were replaced by two male comedians/actors, Ott Sepp and Märt Avandi. Heidy Purga, Mihkel Raud and Rein Rannap continued as judges.

Auditions
Auditions took place in same towns as in first season. The first audition took place in Pärnu on January 12, 2008. Three other auditions were held in Tartu, Jõhvi and Tallinn. Age limits were widened from 16–25 to 15–30. Unlike the first season, acoustic instruments were allowed to use in auditions. More than 2,300 people sang in the auditions. Only about 100 of them advanced to the theatre round.

Theatre rounds
Theatre round took place in Eesti Nukuteater, Tallinn. 30 of 100 new singers were chosen by the judges to the semi-finals.

Semi-finals
Unlike from the first season three semi-finals were held, plus a 'second chance' semi-final. The Semi-finals took place in Club Privé in Tallinn. Ten singers sang in each semi-final. After nationwide televoting, three of them qualified for the finals. Ten singers who failed to advance to the finals were given a second chance by the judges. Kristiina Piperal won the second chance round and was the tenth finalist.

Finals
During the finals 9 shows were aired on TV3. The finals took place in TV3 studio, Pärnu Concert Hall in Pärnu, Jõhvi Concert Hall in Jõhvi, Vanemuise Concert Hall in Tartu, Estonian National Opera concert hall in Tallinn and the Superfinale took place in Linnahall, Tallinn.

Finalists
(Ages stated at time of contest)

Top 10: Film music
 Keit Triisa – "Think" by Aretha Franklin from a film The Blues Brothers
 Timothy Jarman – "Sway" written by Pablo Beltrán Ruiz from a film Shall We Dance?
 Kirstjan Laas  – "Come What May" by Ewan McGregor and Nicole Kidman from a film "Moulin Rouge!"
 Arno Suislep – "Tulen kord jälle" by Sven Grünberg from a film "Hundiseaduste aegu"
 Eliis Pärna – "Iris" by Goo-Goo Dolls from a film "City of Angels"
 Taavi Immato – "Lonely Day" by System of a Down from a film Disturbia
 Jana Kask – "Saviour" by Anggun from a film "Transporter 2"
 Artur Rassmaann – "You Could Be Mine" by Guns N' Roses from a film "Terminator 2: Judgment Day"
 Kristiina Piperal – "Zombie" by The Cranberries from a film "Blackrock"
 Norman Salumäe – "Grace Kelly" by Mika from a film "Knocked Up"

The bottom three: Keit Triisa, Eliis Pärna, Taavi Immato
The bottom two: Eliis Pärna, Keit Triisa
 Eliminated: Keit Triisa

Top 9: Hip-Hop and R&B
 Norman Salumäe – "Señorita" by Justin Timberlake
 Kristiina Piperal – "Maneater" by Nelly Furtado
 Timothy Jarman – "Let Me Love You by Mario
 Kristjan Laas – "With You" by Chris Brown
 Jana Kask – "Underneath Your Clothes" by Shakira
 Artur Rassmann  – "Killing Me Softly" by Fugees
 Arno Suislep – "Waiting for You" by Seal
 Eliis Pärna – "These Words" by Natasha Bedingfield
 Taavi Immato – "What Goes Around.../...Comes Around" by Justin Timberlake

The bottom three: Kristjan Laas, Timothy Jarman, Norman Salumäe
The bottom two: Norman Salumäe, Timothy Jarman
 Eliminated: Timothy Jarman

Top 8: Estonian music
 Artur Rassmann – "Valgus" by Gunnar Graps
 Kristiina Piperal – "Jää" by Dagö
 Kristjan Laas – "Leekiv armastus" by Genialistid & Lea Liitmaa
 Taavi Immato – "See ei ole saladus" by Terminaator
 Jana Kask – "Palun andeks su käest" by Smilers
 Norman Salumäe – "Kui mind enam ei ole" by Urmas Alender
 Eliis Pärna – "Sinu hääl" by Liisi Koikson
 Arno Suislep – "Kurjuse laul" by Olav Ehala

The bottom three: Kristjan Laas, Jana Kask, Artur Rassmann
The bottom two: Jana Kask, Kristjan Laas
 Eliminated: Kristjan Laas

Top 7: Unplugged
 Arno Suislep – "Ilmarine ja Dvigatel" by Ultima Thule
 Jana Kask – "My All" by Mariah Carey
 Taavi Immato – "Ordinary people" by John Legend
 Kristiina Piperal – "Creep" by Radiohead
 Norman Salumäe – "Fly Away" by Lenny Kravitz
 Artur Rassmann – "Hotel California" by Eagles
 Eliis Pärna – "Lumevärv" by Jäääär

The bottom three: Taavi Immato, Norman Salumäe, Arno Suislep 
The bottom two: Taavi Immato, Norman Salumäe
 Eliminated: Taavi Immato

Top 6: Frank Sinatra
 Eliis Pärna – "Girl From Ipanema"
 Arno Suislep – "All or Nothing at All"
 Jana Kask – "Strangers in the Night"
 Artur Rassmann – "Fly Me to the Moon"
 Norman Salumäe – "Love and Marriage"
 Kristiina Piperal – "Theme from New York, New York"

The bottom two: Artur Rassmann, Eliis Pärna
 Eliminated: Eliis Pärna

Top 5: Rock & Disco
 Norman Salumäe – "Ära piina mind" by Lea Liitmaa
 Kristiina Piperal – "Naer" by Virmalised
 Artur Rassmann – "The Final Countdown" by Europe
 Jana Kask – "Je t'aime" by Lara Fabian
 Arno Suislep – "Massikommunikatsioon" by Singer Vinger
 Norman Salumäe – "I Promised Myself" by Nick Kamen
 Kristiina Piperal – "Girls Just Want to Have Fun" by Cyndi Lauper
 Artur Rassmann – "Ühega miljoneist" by 2 Quick Start
 Jana Kask – "I Feel Love" by Blue Man Group
 Arno Suislep – "Enjoy The Silence" by Depeche Mode

The bottom two: Kristiina Piperal, Norman Salumäe
 Eliminated: Norman Salumäe

Top 4: Ivo Linna/Tõnis Mägi & Billboard Chart
 Artur Rassmann – "Kuldaja rock' n' roll" by Muusik Seif
 Jana Kask – "Laula mu laulu helisev hääl" by Ivo Linna
 Arno Suislep – "Aed" by Ultima Thule
 Kristiina Piperal – "Vana vaksal" by Ivo Linna
 Artur Rassmann – "I Still Haven't Found What I'm Looking For" by U2
 Jana Kask – "Lady Marmalade" by Christina Aguilera, Mýa, Pink, Lil' Kim
 Arno Suislep – "Spaceman" by Babylon Zoo
 Kristiina Piperal – "Nothing Compares To You" by Sinéad O'Connor

The bottom two: Artur Rassmann, Arno Suislep
 Eliminated: Artur Rassmann

Top 3: Duets
 Kristiina Piperal – "Violet Hill" by Coldplay
 Arno Suislep – "Kosmoseodüsseia" by Vaiko Eplik ja Eliit
 Jana Kask – "Wake Up Call" by Maroon 5
 Kristiina Piperal with Lauri Saatpalu – "Kaks Takti Ette" by Dagö
 Arno Suislep with Lenna Kuurmaa – "Saatus naerdes homse toob" by Lenna Kuurmaa
 Jana Kask with Cram – "Swamped" by Lacuna Coil

 Eliminated: Kristiina Piperal

Superfinal
 Jana Kask – "Uninvited" by Alanis Morissette
 Arno Suislep – "The World Is Not Enough" by Garbage
 Jana Kask –  "Lady Marmalade" by Christina Aguilera, Mýa, Pink, Lil' Kim
 Arno Suislep – "Spaceman" by Babylon Zoo
 Jana Kask – "Ma tahan olla öö" by Jaan Tätte & Olav Ehala
 Arno Suislep – "Vaiki kui võid" by Ruja

 Winner:  Jana Kask  
 Runner-up: Arno Suislep

Elimination chart

After the show
After winning the show, Jana Kask started collaboration with Alar Kotkas and his team to finish Kask's debut album. On October 30, 2008, she released her first single "Leaving You For Me", which was said to be written by Swedish composers specially for Jana. Although later in the media it was found out that the song had been previously sung by Martin Kesici and Tarja Turunen.

One year after winning the show Jana Kask has not released her debut album. Kask has said that she has done anything and she don't know why the album has not released by her record company. Kask's producer Alar Kotkas explained that album has not been released due to the risks in the market, but was hopeful that album will be released during the summer of 2009.

In August 2009, when the auditions of third season of Eesti otsib superstaari had already begun, Jana's debut album had still not been released. Since Alar Kotkas had not released the album, Jana started collaboration with Ivar Must. In September 2009 Jana and her new manager Ivar Must, announced that debut album is completed. When album will be released is unknown at the moment.

One of few finalists who are still active in music industry is Taavi Immato, who got 7th place. Since June 2009, Immato is a singer in popular Estonian band, Shanon. Together with Shanon, Immato has released a debut album "Üksinda" (Alone).

Timothy Jarman, an English singer living in Estonia, who got 9th place in the finals, started his own record company. It is named Jarman Records. Jarman has released a debut single "You and Me".

Keit Triisa, who got 10th place in the finals, started acting career. In summer of 2009 Triisa acted in Ugala Theatre's summer play  "Charley's Aunt". Also Kristjan Laas, who reached 8th place, has started his acting career in ETV's TV-series "Klass" (Class).

References

Season 02
2008 Estonian television seasons
2000s Estonian television series